Crown Lake is an American anthology streaming television series produced and distributed by Brat TV. The series is written by Sara Shepard and produced by Shepard alongside Lilia Buckingham. It first premiered on June 20, 2019, and was renewed for a second season later that year. In February 2022, the series renewed for a third season with a new cast.

Premise
Set in 1994, the series follows Eleanor "Nellie" Chambers as she navigates being a new student at an elite boarding school with a guide left behind by a former student.

Cast

Main
Francesca Capaldi as Eleanor "Nellie" Chambers (seasons 1 & 2), a girl from a poor background desperate to fit in. She is attending Crown Lake Academy because the Roach Gang pay her tuition.
Emily Skinner as Chloe Hauser (seasons 1 & 2), a rebellious outsider with limited social skills and Nellie’s best friend at Crown Lake. She is an ammeter Slam Poet
Kyla-Drew as Tiffany St. Martin (seasons 1 & 2), a girl from a very rich background who is the most popular girl in Crown Lake and Nellie’s roommate. 
Lilia Buckingham as “Heather Masterson” (narrator) (seasons 1-), an unknown person who uses “Heather” as an identity to either help, bully, manipulate or attack people.
Ollie Walters as Ryan Baker (seasons 1 & 2), Tiffany’s boyfriend who is from a poor background similar to Nellie’s who is attending Crown Lake under a scholarship. He is on the Crew, Lacrosse and Wrestling teams.
Glory Curda as Becca Frank (seasons 1 & 2), a gossipy girl who is friends with Tiffany and best friends with Erin. She has a hopeless crush on Tiffany’s brother, Evan.
Mia Dinoto as Erin Roy (seasons 1 & 2), a vain and ditzy girl who is friends with Tiffany and best friends with Becca. Like Becca, she has a hopeless crush on Tiffany’s brother, Evan.
Lucas Stadvec as Josh Lewis (seasons 1 & 2), a popular boy on the Wrestling and Scavenging teams whom Nellie takes an interest in. He is the son of the Head of Math, Dr. Lewis.
Alexis Jayde Burnett as Lucy Quinn (season 2), a nerdy girl who enjoys computing and joins Crown Lake a semester after Nellie. 
Izzi Rojas as Lola Porecca (season 2), a rebellious goth who wishes to be a wrestler. She has a crush on Chloe.
Andy Han as Nick Lazaro (season 2-), the son of the Business Partner of Tiffany’s father and Nellie’s brief boyfriend. He is a drug dealer.

 Ellie Zeiler as Ari Lee (season 3), a popular girl who is struggling with her sexuality, dating a boy named Oliver but having feelings for her ex-roommate Lisa. She is roommates with Molly. 
 Symonne Harrison as Molly King (season 3), a tomboyish girl from California who starts attending Crown Lake at the beginning of a new semester. She becomes interested in the “Heather” system and the Great Crown Lake Fire (which occurred during Nellie’s Senior Year at Crown Lake) after finding an old diary left by Nellie under her dorms floorboards. 
 Nick Bencivengo as Danny (season 3), the son of Hank, the Caretaker at Crown Lake and Molly’s boyfriend. He isn’t rich like most of the Crown Lake students, so he struggles to fit in. 
 Mya Nicole Johnson as Lisa (season 3), a closeted lesbian who is trying to hide her sexuality and feelings for her best friend and ex-roommate Ari due to her homophobic family. She is at Crown Lake because of a Scholarship. 
 Erika Titus as Callie Lee (season 3), the adopted older sister of Ari and the adopted younger sister of Electra. Unlike her adopted sisters, Callie is ditzy and carefree, but very kind. 
 Josie Alesia as Electra Lee (season 3), the adopted older sister of Callie and Ari. She is stern and serious and Head of Student Council. She is a stickler for rules and obsessed with her studies.
 Nikolai Soroko as Oliver (season 3), a popular boy dating Ari. He is very spoiled and arrogant, and dangerous to anyone who crosses him.
 Jasmin Tatyana as Morgan (season 3), Lisa’s new roommate and an unpopular computer geek who spends most of her time on her computer. She designs an app for the school to post gossip about, The White Rabbit.
 Thaddeus Newman as Rhys (season 3), one of Oliver’s friends who is not very intelligent but has a good heart. He is however described as a “player” by Callie.
 Maleah Woode as Ashley (season 3)
 Benni Ruby as Felicity (season 3), the most popular girl in school who is mean to Ari as she sees her as a rival.

Recurring
Paula Jai Parker as Headmistress Catherine Merriweather (season 1-2), the Headmistress of Crown Lake Academy who is a stern disciplinarian and is strict and snarky. She’s also the Aunt of Tiffany St. Martin.
 Headmistress Tiffany Baker (season 3), the Headmistress of Crown Lake Academy in 2022, who replaces Headmistress Hauser when she takes maternity leave. 
Nikki Crawford as Valerie St. Martin, the wealthy mother of Tiffany. She is very critical of her children and has high standards.
Bleau Faz as Bethany (season 1), a student at Crown Lake in 1994.
Vanessa Angel as Dr. Lewis (season 1), the Head of Math in 1994 and the mother of Josh.
Paul Thomas Arnold as Junior Chambers (season 1), the father of Nellie and the Owner of a coffee shop. His wife Dana was violently murdered by the Roach Gang a year before Nellie transferred to Crown Lake. 
Jonah Hwang as Pete (season 1), a student at Crown Lake and Josh’s best friend. He is somewhat inappropriate and misogynistic towards girls.
David Snyder as Chad (season 2), the Captain of the Wrestling Team. He is very arrogant and sexist.
Noelle Perris as Ms. Rose (season 2–), the school Guidance Councillor in 1995. She is cruel and sadistic, and despises Nellie. She attended Crown Lake at the same time as Nellie’s mother, Dana Roth, did.

Episodes

Series overview

Season 1 (2019)

Season 2 (2019–20)

Season 3 (2022)

Production
In May 2019, it was announced Sara Shepard would produce the series for Brat, with Francesca Capaldi, Emily Skinner, Kyla-Drew, Ollie Walters, Glory Curda, and Lucas Stadvec in the cast. Lilia Buckingham would co-produce in her debut producing gig and narrate.

The first episode premiered on June 20, 2019. In November 2019, a teaser and trailer were released for season 2, which premiered on December 5, 2019.

Through Twitter, Brat hinted that plans for a third season were in development, but on hold due to the COVID-19 pandemic.

Brat confirmed on Twitter that season 3 was in development.

In February 2022, Brat confirmed on Twitter that it had started filming saying it'd be "a little different" and shared a teaser.

Reception

References

External links
 

Brat (digital network)
2019 web series debuts
Anthology web series
American drama web series
American teen drama web series
Television series impacted by the COVID-19 pandemic
2010s YouTube series
2020s YouTube series